Nouâtre is a commune in the Indre-et-Loire department in central France.  In 1832 it absorbed the historic commune of Noyers, location of the Benedictine Noyers Abbey.

Population

See also
Communes of the Indre-et-Loire department

References

Communes of Indre-et-Loire